Hedda Gabler is a 1925 German silent drama film directed by Franz Eckstein and starring Asta Nielsen, Paul Morgan and Frida Richard. It is based on Henrik Ibsen's 1891 play Hedda Gabler.

Cast
 Asta Nielsen as Hedda Gabler, Ehefrau von Tesman  
 Paul Morgan as Dr. Jürgen Tesman  
 Frida Richard as Juliane Tesman, die Tante  
 Albert Steinrück as Gerichtsrat Brack  
 Gregori Chmara as Eilert Lövborg  
 Käthe Haack as Thea Elvsted  
 Olga Limburg as die rote Diana 
 Jeanette Bethge as Berte, Dienstmädchen  
 Karl Balta

References

Bibliography
 Reimer, Robert C. & Reimer, Carol J. The A to Z of German Cinema. Scarecrow Press, 2010.

External links

1925 films
Films of the Weimar Republic
Films directed by Franz Eckstein
German silent feature films
German films based on plays
Films based on works by Henrik Ibsen
German black-and-white films
National Film films
German drama films
1925 drama films
Silent drama films
1920s German films
1920s German-language films